Tina Albanese is an American television producer and television writer.

Biography
Albanese worked as a production assistant on the David E. Kelley-produced series L.A. Law, Picket Fences and as a post-production coordinator on Picket Fences and Chicago Hope. She was a consultant during the first season of CSI: Crime Scene Investigation and as a post-production coordinator and associate producer on JAG, co-starring her husband Patrick Labyorteaux.

In 2012, Albanese and Labyorteaux created the Nick at Nite series See Dad Run, starring Scott Baio.

Albanese and Labyorteaux have been married since 1998; they have one child together, a son named Jeau Bennett Labyorteaux (b. 2001).

References

External links

American television producers
American women television producers
American television writers
Living people
American women television writers
Place of birth missing (living people)
Year of birth missing (living people)
21st-century American women